Pisquioc (possibly from Aymara p'isqi white quinoa, Quechua p'isqi a stew or purée of quinoa, -yuq a suffix, "the one with white quinoa")  is a mountain in the Vilcanota mountain range in the Andes of Peru, about  high. It is located in the Cusco Region, Quispicanchi Province, Marcapata District, south of Aquichua.

References

Mountains of Cusco Region
Mountains of Peru